Flagstar is the name used by several businesses including:

Flagstar Bank
Flagstar was a successor of Trans World Corporation based in Spartanburg, South Carolina that owned chain restaurants.  It ultimately changed its name to Denny's